A technology museum is a museum devoted to applied science and technological developments.   Many museums are both a science museum and a technology museum.

Some of the most historically significant technology museums are:
 
the Musée des Arts et Métiers in Paris, founded in 1794;
the Science Museum in London, founded in 1857;
the Deutsches Museum von Meisterwerken der Naturwissenschaft und Technik in Munich, founded in 1903; and 
the Technisches Museum für Industrie und Gewerbe in Vienna, founded in 1918. 
the Computer History Museum in California, founded in the 1970s.
The most prestigious of its kind in Austria is the Technisches Museum in Vienna. 

Many other independent museums, such as transport museums, cover certain technical genres, processes or industries, for example mining, chemistry, metrology, musical instruments, ceramics or paper.

References

See also
Computer Museum

 
Types of museums